Ventino: El precio de la gloria is a Colombian telenovela created by Jhonny Ortiz. It premiered on Caracol Televisión on 1 March 2023. The series follows four singers who on their path to fame, will have to overcome several obstacles including their manager, who is willing to step over anyone who attempts to overshadow her. It stars Natalia Alfanador, Makis de Angulo, Camila Esguerra, Olga Lucía Vives and Carolina Gómez.

Plot 
Martina Pumarejo (Carolina Gómez) is an ambitious woman who, after sleeping with her best friend's boyfriend, becomes pregnant. In order to protect her reputation, she gives birth alone, abandons her daughter and goes ahead with her life. Twenty years later, Martina has become a music producer and the renowned judge of a reality show. One day she meets Natalia, a young singer who publicly accuses her of being a tyrant. As a lesson for Natalia, Martina devises a plan of revenge that has at its center a musical girl group whom she will use as an excuse to humiliate and destroy her.

Cast

Main 
 Natalia Alfanador as Natalia
 Makis de Angulo as María Cristina "Makis"
 Camila Esguerra as Camila
 Olga Lucía Vives as Olga
 Carolina Gómez as Martina Pumarejo
 José Ramón Barreto as Manolo Cano
 César Mora as Adolfo Cano
 Sandra Reyes as Amanda
 Katherine Vélez
 Juan Felipe Samper
 Elkin Díaz
 Anderson Hernández Munera as Alex Cano
 Esteban Díaz
 Mariana Mozo

Recurring and guest stars 
 Yulu Pedraza
 Conrado Alonso Osorio
 Sebastián Moya
 David Nicolás Lancheros
 Gustavo Giraldo
 Antonia Arbeláez
 Antonio Puentes
 Laura Herrera
 Santiago Heins
 Billy Heins
 William Aguirre Aristizábal
 Carlos Miguel Carballo
 Catalina Polo
 Miguel González
 Fernanda González
 Zoe Gabriela Beltrán Medina
 Indhira Serrano
 Mario Lora Martínez
 Samuel Montalvo
 Jacobo Montalvo
 Jorge Hugo Marín

Production 
In June 2022, it was announced that production had begun on Ventino, with the plot being inspired by the girl group of the same name.

Ratings

Episodes

Music 

The soundtrack of the series was released on 13 February 2023. All songs on the soundtrack are performed by Ventino.

References 

2023 telenovelas
2023 Colombian television series debuts
Colombian telenovelas
Caracol Televisión telenovelas
Spanish-language telenovelas